Thomas Streicher (born 1958) is a German mathematician who is a Professor of Mathematics at Technische Universität Darmstadt. He received his PhD in 1988 from the University of Passau with advisor Manfred Broy.

Work 

His research interests include categorical logic, domain theory and Martin-Löf type theory.

In joint work with Martin Hofmann he constructed a model for intensional Martin-Löf type theory where identity types are interpreted as groupoids. This was the first model with non-trivial identity types, i.e. other than sets. Based on this work  other models with non-trivial identity types were studied, including homotopy type theory which has been proposed as a foundation for mathematics in Vladimir Voevodsky's research program Univalent Foundations of Mathematics.

Together with Martin Hofmann he received the 2014 LICS Test-of-Time Award for the paper: The groupoid model refutes uniqueness of identity proofs.

Bibliography 

 T. Streicher (1991), Semantics of Type Theory: Correctness, Completeness, and Independence Results, Birkhäuser Boston. 
 M. Hofmann and T. Streicher (1996), The groupoid interpretation of type theory, in Sambin, Giovanni (ed.) et al., Twenty-five years of constructive type theory. Proceedings of a congress, Venice, Italy, October 19–21, 1995.
 T. Streicher (2006), Domain-theoretic Foundations of Functional Programming, World Scientific Pub Co Inc.

References

External links 

 Official website at Technische Universität Darmstadt
 

20th-century German mathematicians
Living people
Academic staff of Technische Universität Darmstadt
University of Passau alumni
21st-century German mathematicians
1958 births